American country music and folk music singer Mary Chapin Carpenter has received nine major industry awards. These include five Grammy Awards, and two each from the Country Music Association and Academy of Country Music. Her first industry award win came in 1989, when she won Top New Female Vocalist from the Academy of Country Music.

List of awards

References

Lists of awards received by American musician